Hartley Withers (1867–1950) was an English financial journalist and author, editor of The Economist from 1916 to 1921.

Life
He was born at Aigburth, the son of  Henry Hartley Withers, a bank manager and stockbroker, and his wife Jane Livingston Lowndes, daughter of Matthew Dobson Lowndes; the educationist Harry Livingston Withers was his elder brother. He was educated at Westminster School, and matriculated at Christ Church, Oxford in 1886. He graduated in literae humaniores in 1890.

After teaching and working in a stockbrokers, Withers joined The Times, in 1894, going into its City office. According to Frederick Harcourt Kitchin, three men dominated London financial journalism at the beginning of the 20th century, a time at which it was still largely anonymous. Besides Withers and himself, Kitchin nominated as the third Arthur William Kiddy (1868–1950). Withers was at The Times to 1910, becoming City editor. Leaving for The Morning Post, he then in 1911 went into Seligman Bros., the London branch of J. & W. Seligman & Co.

Withers succeeded Francis Hirst as editor of The Economist in 1916, and was replaced in 1921 by Walter Layton. He then concentrated on writing, where he was a prolific book author. His economic views were orthodox of the sound money school.

Notes

1867 births
1950 deaths
British economics writers
English newspaper editors
The Economist editors